The Australasian Performing Right Association Awards of 1999 (generally known as APRA Awards) are a series of awards held in May 1999. The APRA Music Awards  were presented by Australasian Performing Right Association (APRA) and the Australasian Mechanical Copyright Owners Society (AMCOS). Only one classical music award was available in 1999: Most Performed Contemporary Classical Composition. APRA provided awards for "Best Television Theme", and "Best Film Score" in 1999. APRA and AMCOS also sponsored the Australian Guild of Screen Composers (AGSC), which provided their own awards ceremony, from 1996 to 2000, with categories for film and TV composers.

Awards 
Nominees and winners with results indicated on the right.

See also 

 Music of Australia

References

External links 

 APRA official website
 APRA Awards - History

1999 in Australian music
1999 music awards
APRA Awards